The Canon EOS 300V (Kiss 5/All New Kiss in Japan and Rebel Ti in North America) is a 135 film auto-focus SLR camera, introduced by Canon in 2002 to upgrade Canon's EOS Rebel series of autofocus consumer SLR cameras.

Upon its release, the Rebel Ti had the fastest autofocus and most advanced autoexposure in its class.  Among the more welcomed improvements was the new stainless steel lens mount, replacing the less durable plastic mount found on previous EOS Rebel cameras.

References

External links

 Official Canon Museum Entry for Rebel Ti
 Official Canon UK Website Archived Product Page

300V